Phoxichilidium is a genus of sea spiders within the family Phoxichilidiidae. Members of this genus can be found in all oceans at depths up to 1074 meters.

Species 

 Phoxichilidium alis 
 Phoxichilidium cheliferum 
 Phoxichilidium femoratum 
 Phoxichilidium forfex 
 Phoxichilidium horribilis 
 Phoxichilidium micropalpidum 
 Phoxichilidium mutilatus 
 Phoxichilidium olivaceum 
 Phoxichilidium plumulariae 
 Phoxichilidium ponderosum 
 Phoxichilidium pyrgodum 
 Phoxichilidium quadradentatum 
 Phoxichilidium tuberculatum 
 Phoxichilidium tuberungum 
 Phoxichilidium ungellatum

References 

Pycnogonids